The Voronezh electoral district was a constituency created for the 1917 Russian Constituent Assembly election. The electoral district covered the Voronezh Governorate. 8 out of 16 candidate lists submitted were disqualified from contesting.

Results

In Voronezh town the Kadets emerged victorious, obtaining 12,380 votes (58.1%), the SRs 2,611 votes (12.2%), the Bolsheviks 2,536 votes (11.9%), the Mensheviks 1,531 (7.2%), the Popular Socialists 1,289 votes (6.1%), the Union of Landowners 596 votes (2.8%), the Ukrainian SR-SR leftist-PPS list 360 votes (1.7%) and the Mazury list 9 votes. In the Voronezh garrison, the Bolsheviks dominated the polls. They obtained 1,991 votes (56.3%), the SRs 847 votes (23.9%), the Kadets 393 votes (11.1%), the Ukrainian SRs and allies 195 votes (5.5%), the Mensheviks 51 votes (1.4%), the Popular Socialists 33 votes (0.9%), the Union of Landowners 30 votes (0.8%) and the Mazury Society 2 votes (0.1%).

References

Electoral districts of the Russian Constituent Assembly election, 1917